"A Different Corner" is a song written and performed by George Michael that was released on Epic Records (Columbia Records in the US) in 1986 .

Background & Writing
"A Different Corner" was written by Michael while Wham! were at their peak as a duo, and during a low point in his life:

Michael admitted that "A Different Corner" was the "most honest" and personal song he had ever done. He elaborated further on the song's meaning:

According to Michael, the song took roughly 14 hours to write and record from beginning to end. The synthesizer textures were created with a Roland Juno-60 synthesizer.

History
At the time of its release in March 1986, Michael was still a member of pop duo Wham! (the song is included on Wham!'s album Music from the Edge of Heaven only released in Japan and North America, as well as their compilation album The Final, released worldwide), though he and partner Andrew Ridgeley had announced that they would split in the summer after a farewell single, album and concert. Michael had already enjoyed a solo number one on the UK Singles Chart in 1984 with "Careless Whisper", which was credited as Wham! featuring George Michael in the US.

After radio DJ Simon Bates first aired "A Different Corner" on Radio 1, he rated the song so highly that he immediately played it again from the beginning. Michael went back to the top of the UK chart with "A Different Corner", becoming the first solo act in the history of the UK chart to reach number one with his first two releases, although he was hardly an unknown or new act on either occasion due to his previous hits with Wham!. The song reached number 7 on the US Billboard Hot 100, thus becoming the first single credited solely to Michael to become an American top-ten hit which was enough to make American executives at Epic Records confident that Michael would be viable as a solo artist and helped get the gears in motion for his solo album debut Faith. It was the first song to reach number one in the UK charts to be written, performed and produced by the same person.

The song was also remixed for his compilation Ladies & Gentlemen: The Best of George Michael. This version omitted the guitar and Michael's background vocals during the instrumental break.

The song was featured in a 1986 episode of the US daytime soap opera Days of Our Lives.

The song was performed by Chris Martin as part of a tribute to Michael during the 2017 BRIT Awards.

A note on the back of the sleeve proclaims, "This record is dedicated to a memory."

Cover versions
 1992: Pepsi & Shirlie
 2017: Coldplay

Music video
The music video is set in a sparse white room with a window. George Michael is also dressed in white, and is shown sitting and walking around the room whilst singing the song.

Track listing

7": Epic / A 7033 (UK)
 "A Different Corner" – 3:57
 "A Different Corner" (instrumental) – 4:13

12": Epic / GTA 7033 (UK)
 "A Different Corner" – 3:57
 "A Different Corner" (instrumental) – 4:13

 released in gatefold sleeve

Charts

Weekly charts

Year-end charts

Certifications

References

1986 singles
1986 songs
George Michael songs
European Hot 100 Singles number-one singles
Dutch Top 40 number-one singles
Number-one singles in Norway
Number-one singles in Zimbabwe
RPM Top Singles number-one singles
UK Singles Chart number-one singles
Songs written by George Michael
Song recordings produced by George Michael
1980s ballads
Pop ballads
Contemporary R&B ballads
Soul ballads
Columbia Records singles
Epic Records singles